is a Japanese manga series written and illustrated by Rin Suzukawa. It began serialization on Hakusensha's Young Animal Densi website in June 2015; it has also been published in Young Animal since November 2016 and finished in November 2022. Its chapters have been collected in fifteen tankōbon volumes. An anime television series adaptation by Lerche aired in Japan from July to September 2018.

Plot
The series centers on Hanako Honda, Olivia and Kasumi Nomura, second-year students at an all-girls middle school and the only three members of the Pastimers Club, a not officially recognized club. The club has very ambiguous goals, usually consisting of whatever so-called "pastimes" the girls happen to think up.

Characters

Hanako is Olivia and Kasumi's classmate who is extremely energetic, dragging both of them into her pace by playing strange games at school. Despite her childish nature, she is shown to be highly intelligent in her academics and is a natural talent in sports, although she has no interest in them. Her family is shown to be wealthy, having a butler and being able to obtain objects upon request.

Olivia is Hanako and Kasumi's classmate who pretends to be an American transfer student despite having been born and raised in Japan with foreign parents. Thus, she pretends to speak in broken Japanese to keep her image while gradually getting better to solidify her act.

Kasumi is Olivia and Hanako's classmate who dislikes playing games due to her sister's constant teasing when she was younger. She is very bad at English. She enjoys writing BL fantasies, though ironically, she is extremely androphobic.

Chisato is a female teacher who is blackmailed into becoming the advisor for the Pastimers Club. She often feels downhearted over not being able to find a husband.

Maeda is Hanako's family butler. Due to being probed by aliens, he is capable of firing laser beams out of his butt. He can quickly build or procure any item that Hanako asks for, from an inflatable kiddie pool to a robot that speaks in pre-programmed English phrases.

She is a quiet, bespectacled girl whose real name has not been revealed. Despite her timid demeanor, she managed to win her position anyway due to her vice president's speech that sounded threatening to the rest of the student body. She constantly throws up procedural barriers for the Pastimers Club, and wavers between trying to be friends with them or undermining their club. She also has a habit of seeming terrifying and condescending when she is actually trying to be compassionate.

Nicknamed "Rū", Oka is the leader of the Occult Research Club who befriends the Pastimers Club, teaching them occult-themed games.

Nicknamed "Agrippa", Aguri is Oka's fellow member in the Occult Research Club. She was temporarily out of school for medical reasons.

Tsugumi is a classmate who the Pastimers suspect of being an otokonoko, especially after Olivia overheard Tsugumi breaks up with a boy saying that they have the same thing down there. This led the group to go to great lengths to find out if Tsugumi is really a boy who infiltrated the all-girls school. Tsugumi, being all too aware of their intentions, enjoys teasing the club in return, especially Kasumi.

Sainan is the school's language teacher who often becomes the hapless victim of the girls' mischief.

Takayanagi is the school guidance councilor who is rather manly in appearance. She has an equally manly younger sister in her third year who is president of the Swimming Club.

Kentarō is Hanako's younger brother.

Olivia's older brother, he is an otaku who has two PhDs.

Media

Manga
Asobi Asobase, written and illustrated by Rin Suzukawa, began serialization on Hakusensha's Young Animal Densi website on June 26, 2015, which was later replaced by Hakusensha's Manga Park website on August 1, 2017. The series has also been published in Young Animal since November 25, 2016. The series finished serialization on November 11, 2022. Hakusensha collected its chapters in fifteen tankōbon volumes, released from February 29, 2016, to November 29, 2022.

The manga is digitally published in English on the Comikey manga platform.

Volume list

Anime
A 12-episode anime television series adaptation, directed by Seiji Kishi and animated by Lerche, aired from July 8 to September 23, 2018. The scripts were written by Yuko Kakihara and the music was composed by Masato Koda. Crunchyroll streamed the series outside Asia. In Southeast Asia and South Asia, Muse Communication licensed the series and streamed it on Muse Asia YouTube channel. An original video animation episode was bundled with the manga's seventh volume on December 26, 2018.

Specials

Notes

References

External links
Asobi Asobase at Manga Park 
Anime official website 

2015 manga
Anime series based on manga
AT-X (TV network) original programming
Crunchyroll anime
Hakusensha manga
Lerche (studio)
Muse Communication
School life in anime and manga
Seinen manga
Surreal comedy anime and manga
Works about games